Dirk Trauner (born 17 April 1967 in Linz) is an Austrian chemist.

Education and training 
From 1986 to 1991 Trauner studied biology and biochemistry at the University of Vienna. From 1992 to 1995 he studied chemistry at the Free University of Berlin and completed his diploma under Johann Mulzer, whom he followed to Frankfurt and subsequently Vienna as an assistant. In 1997 he completed his PhD under Mulzer at the University of Vienna summa cum laude. From 1998 to 2000 he was a postdoc under Samuel J. Danishefsky at the Memorial Sloan Kettering Cancer Center in New York City. In 2000 he moved to the University of California, Berkeley, where from 2000 to 2006 he was assistant professor and from 2006 to 2010 associate professor, with additional affiliation to the Lawrence Berkeley National Laboratory from 2005 to 2008. From 2008 to 2017 he was professor for chemical biology and genetics at the Ludwig Maximilian University of Munich. He currently resides as the Janice Cutler Chair in Chemistry at New York University. He is also an adjunct professor of neuroscience at the NYU Grossman School of Medicine, a member of the Neuroscience Institute and of the Perlmutter Cancer Center.

Research 
Trauner is a leader in the fields of photopharmacology and natural product total synthesis. His view is that many biologically active substances even of low molecular weight have not yet been discovered, and he has directed his research group to perform the total synthesis of such compounds. Continuing his pioneering work in photopharmacology, his research group is developing chemical tools that are useful in neuroscience and cell biology but also hold promise as precision therapeutics, controlling the activity and presence of biologically active substances using light.

Distinctions (selected) 
 2021 ACS Cope Scholar Award
 2017 Member, Leopoldina – German National Academy of Sciences
 2016 
 2016 Emil Fischer Medal
 2013 Kitasato Microbial Chemistry Medal
 2008 Roche Excellence in Chemistry Award
 2005 Novartis Young Investigator Award
 2004 Amgen Young Investigator Award

References

External links 
 The Trauner Research Group

Living people
Austrian chemists
1967 births
Members of the German Academy of Sciences Leopoldina